1111 Pennsylvania Avenue is a mid-rise Postmodern office building located in Washington, D.C., in the United States. It is a "contributing" resource to the Pennsylvania Avenue National Historic Site.

History of the site

The site, on the northeast corner of 12th Street NW and Pennsylvania Avenue NW, was originally occupied by the Fountain Inn, erected in 1815 after the burning of Washington. This structure was razed and in 1847 the four-story Fuller Hotel opened. Renamed the Kirkwood House, it was the residence of Vice President Andrew Johnson; he took the oath of office of the president of the United States there in April 1865 after the assassination of President Abraham Lincoln. Kirkwood House was razed in 1875 and replaced with the Shepherd Centennial Building, a seven-story office building in the Second Empire style (it opened in 1876). The Shepherd Centennial Building was converted into a hotel in 1893 by architect Leon E. Dessez and renamed the Raleigh Hotel. The Raleigh Hotel was razed in 1911 and rebuilt by architect Henry Janeway Hardenbergh as a 13-story Beaux Arts hotel with a rusticated brick, white limestone, and terra cotta exterior.

Current structure

The Raleigh Hotel closed in 1954, and by 1965 developer Jerry Wolman had purchased the site and proposed building the current structure. It was one of the first structures built under the Pennsylvania Avenue redevelopment plan approved in 1964, and the first private building to be built. Named the Presidential Building (or the Presidential Office Building), the structure was designed by Edmund W. Dreyfuss & Associates in the Brutalist style. Dreyfuss worked closely on the building with John Woodbridge, a staff architect for the President's Council on Pennsylvania Avenue and a member of the firm Skidmore, Owings and Merrill. The President's Council chairman was Nathaniel A. Owings, a partner in that firm. The building was completed in mid-1968, and originally had  of interior space. Its address at this time was 415 12th Street NW. The District of Columbia Public Schools leased seven of the floors in the building, with other District government offices renting the remaining space.

2002 renovation
Purchased by local surgeon Laszlo Tauber, one of the richest men in the D.C. area, the structure underwent a $40 million renovation between 2000 and 2002. It was the last private building on Pennsylvania Avenue to be renovated under the Pennsylvania Avenue Development Corporation's 1974 redevelopment plan. The facade was replaced with a Postmodern style more in tune with the nearby Evening Star building addition next to it on Pennsylvania Avenue, and two stories were added. The front entrance was moved from 12th Street NW to Pennsylvania Avenue NW, and the address changed to 1111 Pennsylvania Avenue NW. The architect of record for the structural renovations was Shalom Baranes Associates. Studios Architecture designed the interiors.

An  existed between the renovated structure and the Evening Star building addition to the east. On cloudy days and at night, the light pipe is artificially illuminated with a rainbow of colors.

The law firm of Morgan, Lewis & Bockius leased the entire building in 2002, and signed a long-term lease renewal in 2014.

See also

List of tallest buildings in Washington, D.C.

References

External links
Presidential Building - official website

Henry Janeway Hardenbergh buildings
Office buildings completed in 1968
Office buildings in Washington, D.C.